The following are the national records in athletics in Sweden maintained by its national athletics federation: Svenska Friidrottsförbundet (SF).

Outdoor

Key to tables:

+ = en route to a longer distance

h = hand timing

OT = oversized track (> 200m in circumference)

Men

Women

Indoor

Men

Women

References
General
Swedish Records 4 March 2023 updated
Specific

External links
SF web site

Sweden
Records
Athletics
Athletics